Penicillium velutinum is an anamorph species of fungus in the genus Penicillium which produces citrinin. Penicillium velutinum can spoil fruit juices.

Further reading

References 

velutinum
Fungi described in 1935